John Stoddard may refer to:

 John Fair Stoddard (1825–1873), American educator and writer
 John Lawson Stoddard (1850–1931), American writer
 John Williams Stoddard (1837–1917), American manufacturer of agricultural implements and automobiles
 John Stoddard (businessman) (1809–1879), American merchant and planter

See also
 Jonathan Stoddard (1807–1855), American lawyer
 John Stoddard Cancer Center, Des Moines, Iowa
 John Stoddart (disambiguation)